Idiomarina xiamenensis is a bacterium from the genus of Idiomarina which has been isolated from seawater from the Xiamen Island in China.

References

Bacteria described in 2011
Alteromonadales